Imogen Kogge (born 8 February 1957) is a German actress. She appeared in more than forty films since 1983.

Selected filmography

References

External links 

1957 births
Living people
German film actresses